A potentially habitable exoplanet is a hypothetical type of planet that has liquid water and may support life.
As of March 2020, a total of 55 potentially habitable exoplanets have been found.
Of those, one is believed to be Sub-terran (Mars-size), 20 Terran (Earth-size) and 34 Super Terran (Super Earths). The main feature of potentially habitable exoplanets is that they have to be located in the habitable zone of their stellar systems (although life is also possible outside this zone, and estimates of the extent of the zone can also vary widely).

Characteristics

Mass 
In order to be potentially habitable, an exoplanet would have to have a mass between 0.1 and 10 Earth masses.

Radius 
The radius of a habitable exoplanet would range between 0.5 and 2.5 Earth radii.

Temperature 
The temperature among the habitable exoplanets discovered so far are estimated to range from 182 Kelvin (Kepler 186f) to 285 Kelvin (Tau Ceti e).

Host star 
It is believed that F, G, K and M-type stars could host habitable exoplanets. G-type stars would allow to host the exoplanets most similar to Earth, that is, Earth-like planets. K-type stars would provide the necessary conditions for super habitable exoplanets, which are exoplanets that could be more habitable than Earth. 

M-type stars also considered possible hosts of habitable exoplanets, even those with flares such as Proxima b. However, it is important to bear in mind that flare stars could greatly reduce the habitability of exoplanets by eroding their atmosphere.

About half of the stars similar in temperature to the Sun could have a rocky planet able to support liquid water on its surface, according to research using data from NASA's Kepler Space Telescope.

See also 
List of potentially habitable exoplanets
Planetary habitability
Earth analog
Habitable exomoon
Superhabitable exoplanet

References 

Planetary habitability
Exoplanetology
 
Search for extraterrestrial intelligence
Types of planet